Vidmantas is a Lithuanian masculine given name and may refer to the following individuals:
Vidmantas Bačiulis (born 1940), Lithuanian screenwriter, film and TV film director
Vidmantas Bartulis (1954–2020), Lithuanian composer
Vidmantas Jažauskas (born 1961), Lithuanian painter, book illustrator, poet and social activist
Vidmantas Jusionis (born 1961), Lithuanian painter
Vidmantas Mališauskas (born 1963), Lithuanian chess Grandmaster
Vidmantas Plečkaitis (born 1957), Lithuanian painter, artist, public figure and politician 
Vidmantas Povilionis (born 1948), Lithuanian politician
Vidmantas Vyšniauskas (born 1969), Lithuanian football midfielder
Vidmantas Žiemelis (born 1950), Lithuanian politician

Lithuanian masculine given names